Wesley Pardin (born 1 January 1990) is a French handball player for Pays d’Aix UC and the French national team.

He represented France at the 2020 European Men's Handball Championship.

References

External links

1990 births
Living people
French male handball players
People from Le Lamentin